SEMTA or Semta may refer to:

Acronyms SEMTA
 Southeastern Michigan Transportation Authority, later renamed Suburban Mobility Authority for Regional Transportation
 Sector Skills Council for Science, Engineering and Manufacturing Technologies
 Serviço Especial de Mobilização de Trabalhadores para a Amazônia

Place (Semta)
 Semta (Africa), a former Ancient city and bishopric in Africa Pronconsularis, now a Latin Catholic titular see